Sedum acre, commonly known as the goldmoss stonecrop, mossy stonecrop, goldmoss sedum, biting stonecrop and wallpepper, is a perennial flowering plant in the family Crassulaceae. It is native to Europe, but also naturalised in North America, Japan and New Zealand.

Description
For much of the year the stems are short, semi-prostrate and densely clad in leaves. At the flowering time in June and July, the stems lengthen and are erect, somewhat limp and often pinkish-brown with the leaves further apart. The leaves are alternate, fleshy and shortly cylindrical with a rounded tip. They are also sometimes tinged with red. The starry flowers form a three to six-flowered cyme. The calyx has five fleshy sepals fused at the base, the corolla consists of five regular bright yellow petals, there are ten stamens, a separate gynoecium and five pistils. The fruit consists of five united, many-seeded follicles. The leaves contain an acrid fluid that can cause skin rashes.

Habitat
Biting stonecrop is a low-growing plant that cannot compete with more vigorous, fast-growing species. It is specially adapted for growing on thin dry soils and can be found on shingle, beaches, drystone walls, dry banks, seashore rocks, roadside verges, wasteland and in sandy meadows near the sea.

Cultivation
Biting stonecrop spreads when allowed to do so, but is easily controlled, being shallow-rooted.  It is used in hanging baskets and container gardens, as a trailing accent, in borders, or as groundcover.  This plant grows as a creeping ground cover, often in dry sandy soil, but also in the cracks of masonry. It grows well in poor soils, sand, rock gardens, and rich garden soil, under a variety of light levels.

References

acre
Flora of Europe
Medicinal plants
Plants described in 1753
Taxa named by Carl Linnaeus
Flora of North Africa